Notochelone is an extinct genus of sea turtle, which existed about 100 million years ago. The species was first described by Richard Owen in 1882 as Notochelys costata. It was renamed by Richard Lydekker in 1889. It was the most common marine reptile living in the inlands of the sea around Queensland, Australia. Its holotype was a small turtle, and was about the same size as the modern green turtle, but might have been a juvenile. Analytical studies have indicated that the creatures frequently ate benthic molluscs.

References

External links
www.scistp.org
Display of a Notochelone at the Richmond Marine Fossil Museum.

Early Cretaceous turtles
Protostegidae
Prehistoric reptiles of Australia
Prehistoric turtle genera
Taxa named by Richard Lydekker
Turtles of Australia
Extinct turtles